Gilles Grangier (5 May 1911 – 27 April 1996) was a French film director and screenwriter. He directed more than 50 films and several TV series between 1943 and 1985. His film Archimède le clochard was entered into the 9th Berlin International Film Festival, where Jean Gabin won the Silver Bear for Best Actor. He had the most number of successful films at the French box office between 1945 and 2001 with 42 of his films having admissions of 500,000 or more, more than any other.

Selected filmography

Trente et Quarante (1945)
 The Black Cavalier (1945)
Lessons in Conduct (1946)
 Rendezvous in Paris (1947)
 Woman Without a Past (1948)
 The Straw Lover (1951)
 L'Amour, Madame (1952)
 Faites-moi confiance (1954)
 Poisson d'avril (1954)
 Gas-Oil (1955)
 Spring, Autumn and Love (1955)
 Blood to the Head (1956)
 Le rouge est mis (1957)
 Three Days to Live (1957)
  (1958)
 Le désordre et la nuit (1958)
  (1959)
 Archimède le clochard (1959)
 The Old Guard (1960)
 The Counterfeiters of Paris (1961)
 The Gentleman from Epsom (1962)
 La Cuisine au Beurre (1963)
 The Trip to Biarritz (1963)
 Maigret Sees Red (1963)
 That Tender Age (1964)
 Les Bons Vivants (1965)
 Train d'enfer (1965)
 Under the Sign of the Bull (1969)
 Quentin Durward (1971, TV series)

References

External links

Biography and filmography by "Cinereves" (French)

1911 births
1996 deaths
French film directors
French male screenwriters
Writers from Paris
20th-century French screenwriters
20th-century French male writers